Joan Antoni Carrillo Milán (born 8 September 1968) is a Spanish retired footballer who played as a midfielder, and later became a manager.

Playing career
Born in Monistrol de Montserrat, Barcelona, Catalonia, Carrillo made his debuts as a senior with CF Lloret, and went on to appear for Girona FC, FC Andorra, RCD Espanyol B, Polideportivo Ejido, Palamós CF and UE Vilassar de Mar. With the latter he retired in 2001, after appearing regularly in both Segunda División B and Tercera División.

Managerial career
Shortly after his retirement, Carrillo started working at RCD Espanyol for the club's youth setup, first team and sportive area. On 3 July 2006 he was appointed Girona FC manager, with the club in the fourth level.

On 5 February 2007 Carrillo was sacked, with the Albirrojos alleging poor performances. He subsequently returned to Espanyol, being assigned as the reserves' assistant.

Carrillo was appointed RCD Espanyol assistant manager in July 2009, behind Mauricio Pochettino. In June 2011 he joined the backroom staff of Paulo Sousa by becoming the assistant manager of Hungarian club Videoton FC.

On 6 June 2014 Carrilllo was appointed at the helm of the club, replacing fired José Gomes. Roughly a year later, despite being crowned champions, he was dismissed.

On 19 October 2015 Carrillo was named UD Almería manager, replacing fired Sergi Barjuán. He was relieved from his duties on 20 December, with the club being in a winless run of 15 matches.

Carrillo was appointed as the new HNK Hajduk Split manager in December 2016. After finishing third in his first season, he was sacked on 6 November 2017 after a 2–3 loss to bottom side NK Rudeš.

On 11 December 2017, Carrillo replaced fellow Spaniard Kiko Ramírez at the helm of Wisła Kraków. He left by mutual accord the following June after taking them to sixth in the Ekstraklasa.

On 25 November 2019 he was appointed as the manager of the Nemzeti Bajnokság I club Fehérvár FC after Marko Nikolić was dismissed by the club due to a 1–3 home defeat against Puskás Akadémia FC at MOL Aréna Sóstó. He left the club in July of the following year, subsequently taking over Cypriot side AEK Larnaca FC in September but being dismissed in November.

On 8 November 2021, he was appointed as the manager of Nemzeti Bajnokság I club, Debreceni VSC. On 1 February 2023, he returned to Spain and its second division after being appointed manager of CD Lugo, but was sacked on 6 March after five matches without a win.

Personal life
Carrillo's brother, Lluís, is also a manager.

Managerial statistics

Honours

Manager
Videoton
Hungarian Premier League: 2014–15

References

External links
Videoton FC profile 

1968 births
Living people
People from Bages
Sportspeople from the Province of Barcelona
Footballers from Barcelona
Spanish footballers
Association football midfielders
Segunda División B players
Tercera División players
Girona FC players
FC Andorra players
RCD Espanyol B footballers
Polideportivo Ejido footballers
Palamós CF footballers
UE Vilassar de Mar players
Spanish expatriate footballers
Spanish expatriate sportspeople in Andorra
Expatriate footballers in Andorra
Spanish football managers
Girona FC managers
UD Almería managers
Fehérvár FC managers
HNK Hajduk Split managers
Wisła Kraków managers
AEK Larnaca FC managers
Debreceni VSC managers
CD Lugo managers
Segunda División managers
Cypriot First Division managers
Nemzeti Bajnokság I managers
Spanish expatriate football managers
Spanish expatriate sportspeople in Hungary
Spanish expatriate sportspeople in Croatia
Spanish expatriate sportspeople in Poland
Spanish expatriate sportspeople in Cyprus
Expatriate football managers in Hungary
Expatriate football managers in Croatia
Expatriate football managers in Poland
Expatriate football managers in Cyprus